The 4th JOOX Thailand Music Awards was an awarding ceremony presented by JOOX Thailand, giving recognition to the Thai entertainment industry in the field of music for their achievements in the year 2019. Aside from the usual music categories, a set of lifestyle categories were also introduced for the first time in partnership with Sanook. Nominees in 12 out of 14 main categories and 5 special categories were voted upon by fans through the JOOX app while only the special categories through the Sanook website. Voting period started on 13 February 2020 at 10:00 ICT and ended on 8 March 2020 at 23:59 ICT. The nominees in the remaining 2 main categories were determined by their number of streams via the app.

Originally scheduled for Wednesday, 25 March 2020 at Central World Plaza, the awards night was postponed due to the COVID-19 pandemic. It was later held online on Wednesday, 1 July 2020 through the JOOX app and Sanook website. The event was hosted by Niti Chaichitathorn and Thanakorn Chinnakul.

Awards 
Nominations were announced on 12 February 2020. Winners are listed first and highlighted in bold:

Main (Music)

Special (Lifestyle)

Multiple nominations and awards

References 

2020
Joox
Music events postponed due to the COVID-19 pandemic